Telegram Messenger application has been blocked by multiple countries.

Azerbaijan 

From 27 September 2020, following the start of the war in Karabakh, the Azerbaijani Ministry of Transport, Communications and High Technologies imposed temporary restrictions on the use of social media in the country. Telegram, Facebook, WhatsApp, YouTube, Instagram, TikTok, LinkedIn, Twitter, Zoom and Skype were completely blocked. Many other unrelated services were also blocked due to a lack of coordination. The restriction was lifted on 10 November 2020.

Bahrain 

In June 2016, it was found that some ISPs in Bahrain had started to block Telegram.

Belarus

Telegram was a key platform for sharing information and coordinating rallies during the 2020–2021 Belarusian protests. Telegram was one of few communication platforms available in Belarus during the three days of internet shutdown that followed the day of the presidential election, which Belarus's president Alexander Lukashenko won amid widespread allegations of election fraud. On the evening of 11 August, while the Internet shutdown continued, 45 percent of people using Telegram protest chats in Belarus were online, despite the government's efforts to block online access. In October 2020, Apple asked Telegram to remove 3 channels that leaked the identities of the people involved in the Belarusian protests.

Brazil 

In February 2022, the Superior Electoral Court announces that 3 telegram channels, which are allegedly involved in fake news dissemination, had been regionally blocked by their request, under penalty of the Telegram being suspended for 48 hours. This decision includes one of the channels of the far-right journalist Allan dos Santos, who had already had his website (Terça Livre) and YouTube channel deleted by a Supreme Federal Court decision. On March 18, the Superior Electoral Court ordered the suspension of all access to the service, alleging that the platform had repeatedly ignored the court's decisions. Following the Superior Electoral Court's decision, Telegram's founder and CEO Pavel Durov claimed that the court was sending emails to an "old general-purpose email address" that Telegram hadn't been checking, and sought a reinvestigation of the decision. The ban was lifted two days later.

China 

In July 2015, it was reported that China blocked access to Telegram Messenger. According to state-owned People's Daily, Chinese human rights lawyers used Telegram to criticize the Chinese Government and the Chinese Communist Party.

Cuba 

In July 2021, the Cuban government blocked access to several social media platforms, including Telegram, to curb the spread of information during the anti-government protests.

Germany 

On February 11, 2022, the German government announced that 64 Telegram channels, which reportedly potentially violate German laws against hate speech, had been deleted by their request. This included the channel of Attila Hildmann, a self-described nationalist who shared antisemitic conspiracy theories via his channel. According to the press release, Telegram has agreed to cooperate with the German government and delete channels with potentially illegal content in the future.

Hong Kong 

During the 2019–20 Hong Kong protests, many participants used Telegram to evade electronic surveillance and coordinate their action against 2019 Hong Kong extradition bill. On the evening of 11 June 2019, the Hong Kong police arrested Ivan Ip, the administrator of a Telegram group with 20,000 members on suspicion of "conspiracy to commit public nuisance." He was forced by the police to hand over his Telegram history. The next day, Telegram suffered a "powerful" decentralized denial of service attack. Hackers tried to paralyze the target server by sending a large number of spam requests, most of which came from mainland China.

On 28 August 2019 the Hong Kong Internet Service Providers Association announced that the Hong Kong government had plans to block Telegram.

On 16 May 2022 Privacy Commissioner Ada Chung told a Legislative Council committee that the government remains concerned about doxxing and other violations of personal data privacy, and the Office of the Privacy Commissioner for Personal Data is looking at blocking Telegram to address the issue.

India 

In 2019, it was reported that some internet service providers in India were blocking Telegram traffic, including its official website.
Internet Freedom Foundation, an Indian digital liberties organisation filed an RTI on whether Department of Telecommunications (DoT) had banned Telegram or requested ISPs to block traffic. The response from DoT said that it had no information on why the ISPs were blocking Telegram. The High Court of Kerala asked about the central government's view on a plea for banning Telegram for allegedly disseminating child abuse videos and communicating through it.

Indonesia 

On 14 July 2017, eleven domain name servers related to Telegram were banned by the Indonesian Communication and Information Ministry with the possibility of closing all Telegram applications in Indonesia if Telegram did not make a standard operating procedure to maintain content that was considered unlawful in the apps. In August 2017, Indonesian Government has opened full access of Telegram, after Telegram has made self censorship about negative contents mainly radicalism and terrorism. Telegram said that about 10 channels/groups have been deleted from Telegram everyday due to are categorized as negative contents.

Iran 

Telegram was open and working in Iran without any VPN or other circumvention methods in May 2015. In August 2015, the Iranian Ministry of ICT asserted that Telegram had agreed to restrict some of its bots and sticker packs in Iran at the request of the Iranian government. According to an article published on Global Voices, these features were being used by Iranians to "share satirical comments about the Iranian government". The article also noted that "some users are concerned that Telegram's willingness to comply with Iranian government requests might mean future complicity with other Iranian government censorship, or even allow government access to Telegram's data on Iranian users". Telegram has stated that all Telegram chats are private territory and that they do not process any requests related to them. Only requests regarding public content (bots and sticker packs) will be processed. In May 2016, the Iranian government asked all messaging apps, including Telegram, to move all Iranian users' data to Iranian servers. On 20 April 2017, the Iranian government completely blocked Telegram's new voice calls, a service that allows individuals to make calls via secure, end-to-end encryption, and keep their conversations private.Mahmoud Vaezi Chief of Staff of the President of Iran said reason for blocking Telegram free voice calls is so Iranian corporations keep revenue from voice calls.

On 30 December 2017, during anti-government demonstrations across Iran, Telegram has shut down a channel of the Iranian opposition that published calls to use Molotov cocktails against the police, after receiving a complaint from the Iranian government. Pavel Durov explained that the reason for the blocking was a "no calls to violence" policy and confirmed that criticizing local authorities, challenging the status quo and engaging in political debate were seen as "OK" by the platform, while "promoting violence" was not. The opposition group promised to comply with Telegram rules and created a new channel which amassed 700,000 subscribers in less than 24 hours. On December, 31, the Iranian government announced that Telegram has been "temporarily restricted" in order to "ensure calm and security" after the company said it refused to shut down peaceful protesting channels. On January, 13, the app was unblocked by an order of the president Hassan Rouhani, who said that "more than 100,000 jobs had been lost" in Iran as a result of the ban on Telegram. Channels of the opposition remain operational.

In March 2018, Iran's chairman for the Committee for Foreign policy and National Security Alaeddin Boroujerdi announced that Telegram has been targeted to be fully blocked in Iran by 20 April 2018, citing Telegram's role in facilitating the winter protests and the need to promote local apps. President Rouhani agreed with the need to break Telegram's monopoly in Iran, but maintained that he was opposed to a new blockade and did not see it as an effective measure to promote local apps. Iranian MP Mahmoud Sadeghi noted that during the two weeks that Telegram was blocked in January 2018, 30 million Iranians (75% of Telegram's users in Iran) did not start using local messaging apps, but instead turned to VPN services to circumvent the block, rendering the blockade ineffective.

Telegram was blocked by the government on May 1, 2018.

For until one year from the end of the 2017 riots, the Iranian government made available a customized version of Telegram that was under their domain.
In 2019 Mohammad Ali Movahedi Kermani in Tehran Friday prayer declared that Telegram is haram and requested National Information Network deployment like Great Firewall of China.

On 27 September 2019, Bijan Ghasemzadeh, the Iranian prosecutor who ordered the block on Telegram, was arrested for charges of corruption. It is unclear whether or not the charges were related to the ban on Telegram.

Pakistan 

In October 2017, Telegram was inaccessible to users in Pakistan, and as of 18 November 2017, it has been completely blocked on PTCL Network as per instructions from PTA, Pakistan's largest ISP, PTCL mentioned this in a tweet to a user.

Russia 

On 16 May 2017, Russian media reported that Roskomnadzor was threatening to ban Telegram. On 13 April 2018, Telegram was banned in Russia by a Moscow court, due to its refusal to grant the Federal Security Service (FSB) access to encryption keys needed to view user communications as required by federal anti-terrorism law. Enforcement of the ban was attempted by blocking over 19 million IP addresses associated with the service. However they included those used by Amazon Web Services and Google Cloud Platform, due to Telegram's use of the providers to route messages. This led to unintended collateral damage due to usage of the platforms by other services in the country, including retail, Mastercard SecureCode, and Mail.ru's Tamtam messaging service. Users used VPNs to bypass the ban as a result. On 17 April 2018, Russian authorities asked Apple and Google to pull the service from their stores as well as APKMirror, however Apple and Google refused the request. On 28 March 2018, Roskomnadzor reportedly sent a legally binding letter to Apple asking it to remove the app from the Russian version of its App Store and block it from sending push notifications to local users who have already downloaded the app. On 27 December 2018, the largest search engine in Russia, Yandex, removed telegram.org from their search results. On 18 June 2020, the Russian government lifted its ban on Telegram after it agreed to "help with extremism investigations".

Thailand

On 19 October 2020, the National Broadcasting and Telecommunications Commission was ordered to block Telegram due to its use in the 2020 Thai protests.

References 

Internet censorship
Telegram (software)